Morris Township is a township in Morris County, in the U.S. state of New Jersey. As of the 2020 United States census, the township's population was 22,974, an increase of 668 (+3.0%) from the 2010 census count of 22,306, which in turn reflected an increase of 510 (+2.3%) from the 21,796 counted in the 2000 census. The township was named for Lewis Morris, colonial governor of New Jersey.

Located along the Morris and Essex Lines, the township is a wealthy bedroom community, with many residents traveling to work in nearby New York City on NJ Transit which provides commuters with direct access to New York Penn Station and to Hoboken Terminal.

The township is the "doughnut" around Morristown and completely surrounds it, with at least five times the area, though near Morris Plains the width of Morris Township is less than a mile. For 115 years, Morristown was part of Morris Township. The initial separation of Morristown from Morris Township occurred on April 6, 1865. A confusing state of affairs followed for nearly thirty years. On February 18, 1895, the separation was officiated.

Morris Township is home to the Morris County Golf Club and the Morris Museum, which is the second largest museum in New Jersey and has been in operation since 1913. The township is also home to the Morristown National Historical Park which in 1933 became the country's first National Historical Park.

History

Incorporation 
Morris Township was originally formed as of March 25, 1740. The township was named for Lewis Morris, colonial governor of New Jersey.

Portions of the township were taken on December 24, 1740, to form Roxbury Township and on March 29, 1749, to form Mendham Township. Morris Township was incorporated as a township by the Township Act of 1798 by the New Jersey Legislature on February 21, 1798, as part of the state's initial group of 104 townships.

Portions of the township were later taken to create Chatham Township (February 12, 1806), Morristown (April 6, 1865, fully independent in 1895) and Passaic Township (on March 23, 1866, now Long Hill Township).

On September 22, 1860, the Jerseyman reported:The total population of Morris Township is 6,024, being an increase of 1,032 since 1850 and of 348 since 1855. Number of families 1,147; Dwellings 1,124; Farms 256; Churches 11, viz., 3 Presbyterian, 3 Methodist, 2 Episcopalian, 1 Baptist, 1 Roman Catholic, 1 African. Deaths during the year 67. Raised last year 9,191 bushels of Wheat, 5,649 of Rye, 64,808 of Oats, 118,245 of Corn, 7,262 tons of Hay and 8,730 lbs. of Tobacco; and 92,366 lbs. of Butter were made. There are in the Township 1,642 Horses, 36 Mules, 1500 Cows, 200 Oxen, 1100 Young Cattle, 1262 Sheep and 1600 Swine.

Washington Valley Historic District

Many historic properties are in the encompassing Washington Valley Historic District. It was added to the National Register of Historic Places in November 1992. Notable sites located in Washington Valley include the Washington Valley Schoolhouse and the John Smith House. Parts of the district are within neighboring Mendham Township.

Convent Station
Convent Station community is named after the Convent Station railroad station that was constructed there during the 1870s to serve the  complex of the Academy of Saint Elizabeth, a Catholic school operating under the auspices of the Roman Catholic Diocese of Paterson.

Notable neighborhoods include Bradwahl, Cromwell Hills, and the upscale Normandy Park Historic District. The Morris Township Municipal Building and the Morris Township Police Headquarters are located in Convent Station.

Sidney Reso kidnapping 
In 1992, Arthur Seale and his wife kidnapped Exxon executive Sidney Reso, a township resident, from his home. The Seales' sought a ransom of $18.5 million, but Reso died in captivity. The case received nationwide attention.

Geography
According to the United States Census Bureau, the township had a total area of 15.81 square miles (40.96 km2), including 15.68 square miles (40.62 km2) of land and 0.13 square miles (0.34 km2) of water (0.83%).

Unincorporated communities, localities and place names located partially or completely within the township include Convent Station, Gillespie Hill, Loantaka Terrace, Normandy Heights, Normandy Park and Washington Valley.

Morris Township completely surrounds Morristown, making it part of 21 pairs of "doughnut towns" in the state, where one municipality entirely surrounds another. The township borders the Morris County municipalities of Denville, Parsippany–Troy Hills Township, Morris Plains and Hanover Township to the north, Harding Township to the south, Mendham Township and Randolph to the west and Florham Park and Madison to the east.

Demographics

2010 census

The Census Bureau's 2006–2010 American Community Survey showed that (in 2010 inflation-adjusted dollars) median household income was $132,191 (with a margin of error of +/− $7,204) and the median family income was $154,265 (+/− $8,489). Males had a median income of $108,448 (+/− $5,932) versus $64,753 (+/− $12,368) for females. The per capita income for the borough was $65,335 (+/− $4,396). About 1.0% of families and 3.9% of the population were below the poverty line, including 1.0% of those under age 18 and 10.3% of those age 65 or over.

The township has been one of the state's highest-income communities. Based on data from the 2006-2010 American Community Survey, Morris Township had a per capita income of $65,335 (ranked 36th in the state), compared to per capita income in Morris County of $47,342 and statewide of $34,858.

2000 census
As of the 2000 United States census there were 21,796 people, 8,116 households, and 5,949 families residing in the township.  The population density was 1,383.0 people per square mile (534.0/km2).  There were 8,298 housing units at an average density of 526.5 per square mile (203.3/km2).  The racial makeup of the township was 88.63% White, 5.46% African American, 0.15% Native American, 3.90% Asian, 0.01% Pacific Islander, 0.91% from other races, and 0.95% from two or more races. Hispanic or Latino of any race were 3.81% of the population.

There were 8,116 households, out of which 31.2% had children under the age of 18 living with them, 64.6% were married couples living together, 6.8% had a female householder with no husband present, and 26.7% were non-families. 21.8% of all households were made up of individuals, and 7.6% had someone living alone who was 65 years of age or older. The average household size was 2.55 and the average family size was 2.99.

In the township the population was spread out, with 22.7% under the age of 18, 5.8% from 18 to 24, 28.2% from 25 to 44, 27.9% from 45 to 64, and 15.4% who were 65 years of age or older. The median age was 41 years. For every 100 females, there were 89.4 males.  For every 100 females age 18 and over, there were 64.9 males.

The median income for a household in the township was $101,902, and the median income for a family was $116,866. Males had a median income of $80,946 versus $50,864 for females. The per capita income for the township was $54,782. About 2.1% of families and 3.8% of the population were below the poverty line, including 4.9% of those under age 18 and 5.1% of those age 65 or over.

Culture and tourism

Morris Museum
Actively running since 1913, the Morris Museum is the second largest museum in New Jersey at 75,524 square feet (7,016.4 m2). The museum is fully accredited by the American Alliance of Museums.

Morris County Golf Club
Founded in 1894, the Morris County Golf Club was unique at the time in that it was established and operated by women including Nina Howland. The club hosted the United States Women's Amateur Golf Championship in 1896, which was won by Beatrix Hoyt, making it the first national title to be contested in the state. Two of the club's presidents have served as United States Golf Association presidents, which the club joined in 1895. Although he club was established in 1894 the current course was designed in 1916 by prominent architect Seth Raynor. The current Clubhouse was built in 1919.

Some notable figures in the sport have been associated with the Club, including Harry Vardon, Ted Ray, Bobby Jones, Chick Evans and Walter Kozak.

Fosterfields
A 1915 farmhouse and 1854 Revere mansion owned by the families of Caroline Rose Foster are preserved. Activities such as educational programs, historical reenactments, storytellers, and public concerts are open to the general public throughout the year.

Economy

Honeywell had been headquartered in Morris Township.

Companies with offices and facilities in Morris Township include the Louis Berger Group and The Seeing Eye, a guide dog school.

Government

Local government 
Morris Township is governed under the Township form of New Jersey municipal government, one of 141 municipalities (of the 564) statewide that use this form, the second-most commonly used form of government in the state. The Township Committee is comprised of five members, who are elected directly by the voters at-large in partisan elections to serve three-year terms of office on a staggered basis, with either one or two seats coming up for election each year as part of the November general election in a three-year cycle. The Mayor and Deputy Mayor are selected by the Township Committee from among its members at a reorganization meeting held in the first week of January each year.

, members of the Morris Township Committee are Mayor Mark Gyorfy (D, term on committee ends December 31, 2024; term as mayor ends 2023), Deputy Mayor Bud Ravitz (D, term on committee ends 2023; term as deputy mayor ends 2023), Deputy Mayor for Public Outreach Cathy Wilson (D, term on committee and as deputy mayor ends 2023), Jeff Grayzel (D, 2025) and Donna J. Guariglia (D, 2024; elected to serve an unexpired term).

In August 2022, the township committee appointed Donna Guariglia to fill the seat expiring in December 2024 that had been held by Tara Olivo-Moore  until she resigned from office to move out of state. Guariglia  served on an interim basis until the November 2022 general election, when she was chosen by voters to serve the remainder of the term of office.

Federal, state, and county representation 
Morris Township is located in the 11th Congressional District and is part of New Jersey's 25th state legislative district.

 

Morris County is governed by a Board of County Commissioners comprised of seven members who are elected at-large in partisan elections to three-year terms on a staggered basis, with either one or three seats up for election each year as part of the November general election. Actual day-to-day operation of departments is supervised by County Administrator, John Bonanni. , Morris County's Commissioners are
Commissioner Director Tayfun Selen (R, Chatham Township, term as commissioner ends December 31, 2023; term as director ends 2022),
Commissioner Deputy Director John Krickus (R, Washington Township, term as commissioner ends 2024; term as deputy director ends 2022),
Douglas Cabana (R, Boonton Township, 2022), 
Kathryn A. DeFillippo (R, Roxbury, 2022),
Thomas J. Mastrangelo (R, Montville, 2022),
Stephen H. Shaw (R, Mountain Lakes, 2024) and
Deborah Smith (R, Denville, 2024).
The county's constitutional officers are the County Clerk and County Surrogate (both elected for five-year terms of office) and the County Sheriff (elected for a three-year term). , they are 
County Clerk Ann F. Grossi (R, Parsippany–Troy Hills, 2023),
Sheriff James M. Gannon (R, Boonton Township, 2022) and
Surrogate Heather Darling (R, Roxbury, 2024).

Politics
As of October 2017, there were a total of 17,566 registered voters in Morris Township, of which 5,458  (31.1%) were registered as Democrats, 5,694 (32.4%) were registered as Republicans and 6,353 (36.2%) were registered as Unaffiliated. There were 61 voters registered as Libertarians or Greens.

In the 2012 presidential election, Republican Mitt Romney received 51.4% of the vote (6,133 cast), ahead of Democrat Barack Obama with 47.6% (5,679 votes), and other candidates with 0.9% (113 votes), among the 11,990 ballots cast by the township's 16,497 registered voters (65 ballots were spoiled), for a turnout of 72.7%. In the 2008 presidential election, Democrat Barack Obama received 50.9% of the vote (6,509 cast), ahead of Republican John McCain with 47.9% (6,129 votes) and other candidates with 0.6% (81 votes), among the 12,797 ballots cast by the township's 16,201 registered voters, for a turnout of 79.0%. In the 2004 presidential election, Republican George W. Bush received 51.9% of the vote (6,488 ballots cast), outpolling Democrat John Kerry with 47.1% (5,884 votes) and other candidates with 0.5% (88 votes), among the 12,503 ballots cast by the township's 16,466 registered voters, for a turnout percentage of 75.9.

In the 2013 gubernatorial election, Republican Chris Christie received 66.7% of the vote (5,033 cast), ahead of Democrat Barbara Buono with 31.5% (2,380 votes), and other candidates with 1.8% (135 votes), among the 7,674 ballots cast by the township's 16,239 registered voters (126 ballots were spoiled), for a turnout of 47.3%. In the 2009 gubernatorial election, Republican Chris Christie received 55.1% of the vote (5,059 ballots cast), ahead of  Democrat Jon Corzine with 36.0% (3,309 votes), Independent Chris Daggett with 7.9% (730 votes) and other candidates with 0.3% (30 votes), among the 9,185 ballots cast by the township's 15,846 registered voters, yielding a 58.0% turnout.

Education 
Students in pre-kindergarten through twelfth grade attend the schools of the Morris School District, which also serves public school students from the communities of Morristown (K–12) and Morris Plains (9–12). As of the 2018–19 school year, the district, comprised of 10 schools, had an enrollment of 5,216 students and 441.4 classroom teachers (on an FTE basis), for a student–teacher ratio of 11.8:1. Schools in the district (with 2018–19 enrollment data from the National Center for Education Statistics) are 
Lafayette Learning Center (102 students; in grade Pre-K), 
Alexander Hamilton School (293; 3–5), 
Hillcrest School (288; K–2), 
Thomas Jefferson School (314; 3–5), 
Normandy Park School (302; K–5), 
Sussex Avenue School (301; 3–5), 
Alfred Vail School (297; K–2), 
Woodland School (289; K–2), 
Frelinghuysen Middle School (1,081; 6–8) and 
Morristown High School (1,860; 9–12). The nine elected seats on the board of education are allocated based on the population of the constituent municipalities, with five seats assigned to Morris Township.

The Academy of St. Elizabeth is a Catholic school for girls that admitted its first students in 1860, located in the Convent Station area, and operated independently of the Roman Catholic Diocese of Paterson. The school has an enrollment of 230 students and is the oldest school for girls in New Jersey.

The College of Saint Elizabeth is a private Roman Catholic, four-year, liberal arts college for women, located in Convent Station. The college was founded in 1899 by the Sisters of Charity of Saint Elizabeth of New Jersey.

The Rabbinical College of America, one of the largest Chabad Lubavitch Chasidic yeshivas in the world is located in Morristown.  The Rabbinical College of America has a baal teshuva yeshiva for students of diverse Jewish backgrounds, named Yeshiva Tiferes Bachurim. The New Jersey Regional Headquarters for the worldwide Chabad Lubavitch movement is located on the campus.

Transportation

Roads and highways

A few major roads pass through the community including Route 124, Route 24, CR 510, U.S. Route 202, and Interstate 287.

Public transportation
Convent Station is a NJ Transit rail station located on the grounds of the College of Saint Elizabeth, offering service on the Morristown Line to Newark Broad Street Station, Secaucus Junction, Penn Station New York and Hoboken Terminal.

NJ Transit offers local bus service on the 872, 873, 875 and 880 routes, replacing service that had been offered on the MCM1, MCM2, MCM3, MCM4, MCM8 and MCM10 routes until 2010, when subsidies to the local provider were eliminated as part of budget cuts.

The Morris County Traction Company began trolley service in downtown Dover in July 1904, and expanded over the years until the system was completed in 1914 all the way to Newark, via Morristown and Summit, including service in Morris Township. The trolleys were replaced with buses in 1928.

Notable people

People who were born in, residents of, or otherwise closely associated with Morris Township include:

 Ben Bailey (born 1970), comedian and host of Cash Cab
 Warren Bobrow (born ), mixologist, chef, and writer known as the "Cocktail Whisperer"
 Michael Patrick Carroll (born 1958), represents the 25th Legislative District in the New Jersey General Assembly
 Robert Del Tufo (born 1933), Attorney General of New Jersey from 1990–1993
 Caroline Rose Foster (1877–1979), farmer and founder of Fosterfields Living Historical Farm
 Connor Lade (born 1989), professional soccer player
 Charley Molnar (born 1961), head football coach at the University of Massachusetts Amherst
 Dan Quinn (born 1970), head football coach of the Atlanta Falcons who was defensive coordinator for the Super Bowl XLVIII champion Seattle Seahawks
 Joseph Warren Revere (1812–1880), court-martialed Union brigadier general during the American Civil War, and grandson of Paul Revere
 Stephen B. Wiley (1929–2015), politician who served in the New Jersey Senate from 1974 to 1978, where he represented the 23rd Legislative District

References

External links

Morris Township website
Morris School District

School Data for the Morris School District, National Center for Education Statistics

 
1740 establishments in New Jersey
Populated places established in 1740
Township form of New Jersey government
Townships in Morris County, New Jersey